Three Days of Rain is a play by Richard Greenberg that was commissioned and produced by South Coast Repertory in 1997. The title comes from a line from W. S. Merwin's poem, "For the Anniversary of My Death" (1967). The play has often been called Stoppardian but Greenberg says he wasn't aware of Stoppard's work before he wrote the play but instead claims 1967 BBC series The Forsyte Saga was a much greater influence. Three Days of Rain was nominated for the 1998 Pulitzer Prize for Drama.

Plot 
Walker and his sister Nan meet in an unoccupied studio in lower Manhattan in 1995. Walker, who had disappeared the day after his father's funeral, now months later is living in this apartment where his father Ned Janeway and business partner, Theo Wexler, once lived and worked designing the famous "Janeway House". Walker has found their father's journal and attempts to use it to understand the relationship between Ned and Theo.  Nan and Walker's childhood friend Pip (Theo's son) meets with them after the reading of Ned's Will, where the three have learned that Janeway House was left to Pip rather than Ned's children. Walker is furious and accuses Pip of "working on" Ned to bequeath him the house. Pip denies this and protests that he does not understand why the house was not left to Nan and Walker as next of kin. Pip reveals that he doesn't even like the house, which prompts another tirade in Walker. Fed up with Walker's ranting, Pip fights back at Walker verbally.  Pip accuses Walker of having been secretly in love with him for 18 years and reveals that he (Pip) and Nan were secretly sleeping with one another (behind Walker's back) when they were young. Walker runs off into the night. Pip says he may have gone too far and agrees with Nan to sell Walker the house. Nan tries to find Walker to tell him.  Distraught when unable to find him, Nan decides to stay at the studio until he returns. After Walker returns, Nan apologizes and the two of them continue to parse Ned's concise and mysterious journal which opens with the entry: "1960, April 3–5. Three days of rain". Walker believes he's found a confession from Ned, hidden within the pages of the book, to the effect that Ned took credit for Theo's work on the house after Theo's death in 1966. Nan does not accept this interpretation but acquiesces to calm her brother. She tells Walker that Pip would sell him the house, but Walker's new-found "revelation" changes his mind about wanting it.  Walker burns the diary, much to Nan's chagrin.

The second act shifts to an earlier time, with the same three actors portraying members of the previous generation in the same studio apartment, during April 1960 when Janeway House was designed. The actor portraying Walker becoming Walker's father Ned, the actor portraying Pip becoming Pip's father Theo, and the actor portraying Nan becoming Nan and Walker's mother, Lina. The assumptions made in the first half about the parents are shown to be wildly inaccurate. Ned is not the callous, silent patriarch he seemed to the children. Instead he is a shy stutterer, who, while an immensely talented architect, has trouble making eye contact or holding a conversation with anyone. Theo is revealed to be a charismatic man, more concerned with fame and the idea of art, than the creation of any original art itself. Lina, a bohemian southern belle, is dating Theo and their arguments are loud enough to inform the entire neighborhood. Theo and Ned attempt to design a house commissioned by Ned's parents, but Ned recognizes Theo's design as plagiarizing an existing house. Ned and Theo fight, and Theo leaves for a few days to try to work in solitude.

A few days later, Ned runs into Lina during a rainstorm, and they return to the apartment to escape the downpour. Ned invites Lina to stay for dinner, which leads each to reveal issues plaguing them. Lina resolves to leave before succumbing to Ned's unintentional shy sweetness, only to overhear Ned practicing telling Lina that he secretly loves her. Lina confronts Ned, and they spend three days in bed. Theo returns earlier than expected from his work retreat, finding Ned and Lina together in the apartment. He is embarrassed and leaves, with Ned trailing him. Ned attempts to apologize, but learns Theo is upset not about Lina but about failing to return with an original design.  Lina persuades Ned that Theo will be okay, and that Ned should apply his emotions to draw the house she knows he imagines. He sits down to draw, suggesting that it was he who designed Janeway House and not Theo, as Walker had concluded.

Characters 
Walker/Ned
Walker: A quirky and unstable young man, haunted by what he sees as a destructive and unloving relationship with his parents. He has a habit of disappearing suddenly in order to avoid dealing with real life.
Ned: Walker and Nan's father who, despite his son's depiction of him as cold and uncaring, was in his youth a stuttering, shy, and talented architect.

Pip/Theo
Pip: A proudly naïve TV actor and family friend of the Janeway's. Handsome, and not as dumb as he looks, he is constantly frustrated by others taking their lives so seriously, and can't fathom why people see the need to incite drama.
Theo: Pip's father and Ned's business partner. A very charismatic man who is more interested in fame and the accolades that come with it than creating the art that would earn it.

Nan/Lina
Nan: A practical, kind woman. Caring about her family and friends, she finds it difficult to balance her frustration at her brother Walker's craziness and Pip's naiveté. 
Lina: Nan and Walker's mother. A southern belle, easily changeable and tempestuous, beginning to show some of the signposts of mental instability.

Productions 
Three Days of Rain premiered at the South Coast Repertory Second Stage, Costa Mesa, California in March 1997. The director was Evan Yionoulis, with the cast that featured 
John Slattery (Walker/Ned), Patricia Clarkson (Nan/Lina), Jon Tenney (Pip/Theo), and Julia Pearlstein.

New York premiere
The play received its Off-Broadway premiere at the Manhattan Theatre Club, at City Center Stage II, running from November 12, 1997, to January 4, 1998. Directed by Evan Yionoulis the cast featured Patricia Clarkson, John Slattery and Bradley Whitford. The play won the 1998 Obie Award, Direction, and was 1998 Drama Critics' Circle Award Runner-Up, Best American Play.

The play was a finalist for the 1998 Pulitzer Prize for Drama.

The play has enjoyed many subsequent productions in regional theatres across the United States and abroad.

UK Premiere 
It received its British premiere in 1999 at the Donmar Warehouse with Colin Firth, David Morrissey and Elizabeth McGovern.

Steppenwolf 
The Steppenwolf Theater Company produced the play opening February 11, 1999. It starred Tony award winner Tracy Letts, Amy Morton and Ian Bradford and was directed by Tony award winner Anna D. Shapiro. Richard Christiansen, critic for the Chicago tribune, wrote "In Three Days of Rain, Greenberg has constructed an almost perfect showcase for his considerable talents, and Steppenwolf has responded with a director, Anna D. Shapiro, and a cast -- Tracy Letts, Amy Morton and Ian Barford -- that gives his script a lovely, burnished glow in performance."

Broadway 
Arguably the most famous production to date was on Broadway, with Julia Roberts making her stage debut. Ben Brantley, The New York Times reviewer wrote: "And though Ms. Roberts gives a genuinely humble performance, there is no way that this show is not going to be all about Julia."

Opening in April 2006 at the Bernard B. Jacobs Theatre, Roberts co-starred with Paul Rudd and Bradley Cooper. Although it may have been the most eagerly awaited show of the Broadway season in the popular press, it met with poor response from theatrical reviewers and closed as scheduled in June 2006. The New York Times reviewer summed up the experience: "Some movie fans may have the same fear about seeing Ms. Roberts in the flesh. They shouldn't. She looks every inch the magnetic (if theatrically challenged) movie star. Fans of Mr. Greenberg, on the other hand, should definitely stay home."

Seattle Public Theater Production 
The Seattle Public Theater (at Green Lake) produced Three Days of Rain in February 2008.  The dual role of Walker/Ned was played by Evan Whitfield, with Peter Dylan O'Connor as Theo/Pip and Nan/Lina, played by Sheila Daniels, the recently named associate director of the Intiman Theater in Seattle.  The production was directed by Aimée Bruneau.

West End 
A production of Three Days Of Rain, directed by Jamie Lloyd played at the Apollo Theatre in London from February to May 2009, starring James McAvoy as Walker/Ned, Nigel Harman as Pip/Theo and Lyndsey Marshal as Nan/Lina.

The Very Little Theater Production
The Very Little Theater in Eugene, Oregon produced Three Days of Rain in April 2011. The cast consisted of Jay Hash as Walker/Ned, Sydney Behrends as Nan/Lina, and James Lee as Theo/Pip. The production was directed by Sarah Etherton.

South Coast Repertory 
David Emmes was the director of the production at SCR in Orange County, beginning in May 2011. It starred Kevin Rahm as Walker/Ned, Brendan Hines as Pip/Theo, and Susannah Schulman as Nan/Lina.  This was the first time the play returned to SCR since its premiere in 1997.

Carte Blanche Stage Company 
Three Days of Rain was produced by Carte Blanche Stage Company in Milwaukee, Wisconsin in January 2013. Directed by Bo Johnson, starring Nathanael Press as Walker/Ned, Rebecca Segal as Nan/Lina, and Matt Wickey as Pip/Theo.

defunkt theatre 
Three Days of Rain was produced by Portland, Oregon's acclaimed defunkt theatre in the winter of 2013. Directed by Tom Moorman, starring Matthew Kern as Walker/Ned, Christy Bigelow as Nan/Lina and Spencer Conway as Pip/Theo.

Portland Center Stage 
Three Days of Rain was presented at Portland Center Stage in May 2015, with two stars from the NBC drama Grimm in the cast: Sasha Roiz and Silas Weir Mitchell.

Sweetline Theatre Company 
Three Days of Rain was presented by Sweetline Theatre in St. John's, Newfoundland, in November 2016. Directed by Danielle Irvine, it starred Aiden Flynn as Walker/Ned, Alexis Koetting as Nan/Lina, and Paul Wilson as Pip/Theo.

American Theatre Company 
Three Days of Rain was produced by the American Theatre Company of Brussels in February 2020. Directed by Jeremy Zeegers, it starred Ryan Eiland as Walker/Ned, Méabh Maguire as Nan/Lina, and Jimmy Finch as Pip/Theo.

References

External links 
 

2006 plays
Broadway plays
Plays by Richard Greenberg